Marcelo Rodrigues Alves, known as Marcelo Goianira (born August 6, 1980) is a Brazilian footballer who plays as a defensive midfielder in Kalloni of Superleague Greece.

Career

Last update: 26 Nov 2010

References

External links
 
Insports

1980 births
Living people
Brazilian footballers
Brazilian expatriate footballers
Association football midfielders
C.F. Estrela da Amadora players
Panthrakikos F.C. players
Asteras Tripolis F.C. players
AEL Kalloni F.C. players
Primeira Liga players
Super League Greece players
Expatriate footballers in Greece
Brazilian expatriate sportspeople in Greece
Palmas Futebol e Regatas players
Sportspeople from Goiânia
21st-century Brazilian people